Evelyn M. Witkin (née Maisel; March 9, 1921) is an American geneticist who was awarded the National Medal of Science for her work on DNA mutagenesis and DNA repair.

Research
In 1944, Witkin spent the summer at Cold Spring Harbor Laboratory (CSHL).  During her stay she isolated a UV radiation-resistant mutant of E. coli; this was the first time mutations conferring UV radiation-resistance were isolated. She returned to CSHL in 1945 and stayed there to complete her PhD research; her degree was conferred in 1947 and was employed by the Carnegie Institution to continue work at CSHL until 1955. Witkin then worked at the State University of New York's Downstate Medical Center in Brooklyn until 1971. Witkin was appointed Professor of Biological Sciences at Douglass College, Rutgers University in 1971 and was named Barbara McClintock Professor of Genetics in 1979, and then moved to the Waksman Institute at Rutgers in 1983.

Witkin's research since the completion of her PhD was based on DNA mutagenesis, her mutagenesis work led to her work on DNA repair. She articulated the  SOS response. Later, by characterizing the phenotypes of mutagenised E. coli, she and  post doctoral student Miroslav Radman  detailed the SOS response to UV radiation in bacteria. Witkin continued to work on the mechanism of the SOS response until she retired in 1991. The SOS response to DNA damage was a seminal discovery because it was the first coordinated stress response to be elucidated.

Honors 

Witkin was elected as a member of the National Academy of Sciences in 1977, at the time she was one of the few women elected to the Academy; a Fellow of the American Academy of Arts and Sciences (1978), a Fellow of the American Association for the Advancement of Science (1980); and a Fellow of the American Academy of Microbiology. She was awarded the 2000 Thomas Hunt Morgan Medal and her contributions to science have been recognized by the United States government as she was awarded the National Medal of Science in 2002;
For her insightful and pioneering investigations on the genetics of DNA mutagenesis and DNA repair that have increased our understanding of processes as varied as evolution and the development of cancer.
In 2015, she was awarded The Wiley Prize in Biomedical Sciences.

Witkin won the 2015 Lasker Award for Basic Medical Research, with Stephen J. Elledge, "for discoveries concerning the DNA-damage response - a fundamental mechanism that protects the genomes of all living organisms."

Also in 2015, she was named as one of The Forward 50.

Personal life 
Evelyn Witkin was married to psychologist Herman Witkin; their sons are: Joseph Witkin, an emergency physician and founding member of Sha Na Na, and Andy Witkin (d. 2010), a computer scientist. She is also the grandmother of four. She turned 100 in 2021.

References 

1921 births
Living people
American geneticists
American centenarians
Women centenarians
Rutgers University faculty
Fellows of the American Academy of Arts and Sciences
Fellows of the American Association for the Advancement of Science
Members of the United States National Academy of Sciences
National Medal of Science laureates
Columbia University alumni
Recipients of the Albert Lasker Award for Basic Medical Research